The  is a professional wrestling world heavyweight championship owned by the Japanese Big Japan Pro Wrestling (BJW) promotion. It is one of two heavyweight championships promoted by BJW, the other being the BJW Deathmatch Heavyweight Championship. The two titles symbolize the two sides of BJW; the Deathmatch Heavyweight Championship the hardcore wrestling side and the World Strong Heavyweight Championship the strong style side. Like most professional wrestling championships, the title is won as a result of a scripted match. There have been nineteen reigns shared among eleven different wrestlers. Yuji Okabayashi is the current champion in his fourth reign.

History
On March 26, 2012, Yoshihito Sasaki defeated Daisuke Sekimoto in the finals to win the 2012 Ikkitosen Strong Climb tournament. Following his win, Sasaki requested that BJW establish a new championship that would symbolize the "strong" side of the promotion. BJW already had one heavyweight championship, the BJW Deathmatch Heavyweight Championship, but it was contested exclusively in deathmatches. This led to BJW announcing the creation of the BJW World Strong Heavyweight Championship on April 14, 2012. A similar championship in concept existed from 2001 known as the BJW Heavyweight Championship but had long been retired, with Men's Teioh last defending the title in 2004. On May 5, Yoshihito Sasaki defeated Westside Xtreme Wrestling (wXw) representative and the reigning wXw Unified World Wrestling Champion Big Van Walter in a decision match to become the inaugural champion. The BJW World Strong Heavyweight Championship was first defended outside of Japan on May 19 at a wXw event. The championship has also been defended at All Japan Pro Wrestling and Pro Wrestling Zero1 events. 

With the introduction of the BJW Junior Heavyweight Championship in May 2017, BJW announced that from now on wrestlers need to weigh at least  to be able to challenge for the BJW World Strong Heavyweight Championship.

Title history

Combined reigns

{| class="wikitable sortable" style="text-align:center;"
!Rank
!Wrestler
!No. of reigns
!Combineddefenses
!Combineddays
|-
!|
|style="background-color:#ffe6bd"|Yuji Okabayashi †
|
|
|+
|-
!|
|
|
|
|
|-
!|
|
|
|
|
|-
!|
|
|
|
|
|-
!|
|Yasufumi Nakanoue
|
|
|
|-
!|
|
|
|
|
|-
!|
|
|
|
|
|-
!|
|
|
|
|
|-
!|
|Takuya Nomura
|
|
|
|-
!|
|
|
|
|
|-
!|
| Kohei Sato
|
|
|
|-
!|
|
|
|
|
|-

Belt design
The standard Championship belt has three plates on a black leather strap.

See also
Big Japan Pro Wrestling
BJW Deathmatch Heavyweight Championship
BJW Heavyweight Championship

References

General

Specific

External links
Official title history at BJW.co.jp
Title history at Wrestling-Titles.com

Big Japan Pro Wrestling championships
World heavyweight wrestling championships